Maria-Pia Casilio (5 May 1935 – 10 April 2012) was an Italian film actress, best known for major roles in Umberto D. and Un americano a Roma.

Born in San Pio delle Camere, L'Aquila, Casilio was quite active between 1952 and 1960, usually filling roles as a querulous and naive small-town girl. After her marriage with voice actor Giuseppe Rinaldi, she semi-retired from acting. On the Criterion Collection DVD release of Umberto D. Vittorio De Sica comments she was a lucky charm to have her in his films.

Partial filmography

 Umberto D. (1952) - Maria
 Half a Century of Song (1952)
 Siamo tutti inquilini (1953) - Una cameriera
 Terminal Station (1953) - Young bride from Abruzzo (uncredited)
 Il viale della speranza (1953) - Concettine
 Therese Raquin (1953) - Georgette, la bonne
 La valigia dei sogni (1953) - Mariannina
 Bread, Love and Dreams (1953) - Paoletta
 Angels of Darkness (1954) - The Young Girl
 Mid-Century Loves (1954) - Carmela (segment "Guerra 1915-18")
 Neapolitan Carousel (1954) - Nannina
 The Air of Paris (1954) - Maria Pozzi
 Appassionatamente (1954) - Giannina
 The Doctor of the Mad (1954) - Margherita
 Bread, Love and Jealousy (1954) - Paoletta
 An American in Rome (1954) - Elvira
 Dangerous Turning (1954) - Paquita Simoni
 Due soldi di felicità (1954) - Carmela
 An American in Rome (1955) - Anita
 I pappagalli (1955) - Fulvia
 Toto, Peppino and the Outlaws (1956) - Rosina
 Il canto dell'emigrante (1956) - Anna Benetti
 Amarti è il mio destino (1957) - Maria
 Pezzo, capopezzo e capitano (1958) - Maria
 Mogli pericolose (1958) - Elisa
 Gagliardi e pupe (1958) - Rosina
 Arrivederci Firenze (1958) - Patrizia Taylor
 La banda del buco (1960) - Cordelia
 La donna di ghiaccio (1960) - Antonietta, la cuoca
 The Last Judgment (1961) - Waitress
 Cuore matto... matto da legare (1967)
 Lo chiameremo Andrea (1972) - Bruna Parini
 Noi uomini duri (1987) - Ines
 Three Men and a Leg (1997) - Cecconi's wife

References

External links

1935 births
2012 deaths
Italian film actresses
20th-century Italian actresses
People from L'Aquila